Scythris niphozela is a species of moth in the family Scythrididae. It is endemic to New Zealand. It is classified as "At Risk, Naturally Uncommon" by the Department of Conservation.

Taxonomy 
This species was originally described by Edward Meyrick in 1931 using specimens collected by Stewart Lindsay at Birding's Flat in December. George Hudson discussed and illustrated this species in his 1939 publication A supplement to the butterflies and moths of New Zealand. The holotype specimen is held at the Canterbury Museum.

Description 
Meyrick described the species as follows:

Distribution 
This species is endemic to New Zealand. Other than the type locality of Birdings Flat at Kaitorete Spit, this species has been recorded as being found at Long Valley Ridge in the Manorburn Ecological District, Central Otago in February. However S. niphozela is regarded as being endemic to the Kaitorete Spit area.

Biology and life history 
This species is on the wing in October to December.

Host species and habitat 
Larvae of this species has been found on Carmichaelia appressa, an endemic species of plant at the Kaitorete Spit. The moth inhabits the foredune area of this land formation and is regarded as being endemic to the gravel barrier present there.

References

niphozela
Moths described in 1931
Moths of New Zealand
Endemic fauna of New Zealand
Endangered biota of New Zealand
Taxa named by Edward Meyrick
Endemic moths of New Zealand